Mahmudi (also Romanized as Maḩmūdī; also known as Nīmrū Maḩmūdī) is a village in Bezenjan Rural District, in the Central District of Baft County, Kerman Province, Iran. At the 2006 census, its population was 28, in 5 families.

References 

Populated places in Baft County